James Calhoun Langdon Jr. (born September 20, 1945 in Los Angeles, California) is an American attorney and former government official. He served as a member (2001-2005) and briefly chair (Feb. 2005-December 20, 2005) of the President's Foreign Intelligence Advisory Board under George W. Bush. Langdon, a partner in the Akin Gump law firm, was one of Bush's "Pioneer" fundraisers.

He earned a B.B.A. at the University of Texas at Austin in 1967 and a J.D. at the University of Texas School of Law in 1970.

References

External links
Law firm official biography
Washington Post: Bush Adviser Helped Law Firm Land Job Lobbying for CNOOC

|-

Living people
Texas lawyers
McCombs School of Business alumni
Lawyers from Washington, D.C.
1945 births
University of Texas School of Law alumni